Sakon Nakhon (sometimes written Sakhon Nakhon) is a city (thesaban nakhon) in Thailand within the Isan region, and capital city of Sakon Nakhon Province as well as Mueang Sakon Nakhon District, with a population of approximately 76,000. Sakon Nakhon covers the whole tambon of That Choeng Chum and parts of tambons Ngio Don, Huai Yang, Dong Mafai, That Na Weng and Hang Hong.

History
During World War II, Sakon Nakhon became a haven for Free Thais, and a base for Communist activities in the late 1950s.

Geography
Sakon Nakhon lies on a flat plain at about  elevation on the south-west bank of Lake Nong Han, the largest lake of north-east Thailand. The town is surrounded by extensive farmland.

Climate
Sakon Nakhon has a tropical savanna climate (Köppen climate classification Aw). Winters are dry and very warm. The monsoon season runs from May through October, with heavy rain and somewhat cooler temperatures during the day, although nights remain warm. The lowest temperature ever recorded in Thailand is in Sakon Nakhon when  was recorded on 2 January 1974.

Economy
Fish and rice are two of the major products of the region.

Transportation
Route 22 leads west to Udon Thani,  distant, and east to Nakhon Phanom and the border with Laos. Route 223 leads south to That Phanom. Route 213 leads southwest to Kalasin.

There is a regional airport, Sakon Nakhon Airport, on the north side of the city.

Notable people
Notable people born in Sakon Nakthon, and notable residents and ex-residents include:
Jiranun Sakultangphaisal (born 1965 in Sakon Nakthon), philanthropist

References

External links

 Private page
Private photo page
Local events, accommodations, & photo gallery

Populated places in Sakon Nakhon province